The 1910 VFL Grand Final was an Australian rules football game contested between the Collingwood Football Club and Carlton Football Club, held at the Melbourne Cricket Ground in Melbourne on 1 October 1910. It was the 13th annual Grand Final of the Victorian Football League, staged to determine the premiers for the 1910 VFL season. The match, attended by 42,790 spectators, was won by Collingwood by a margin of 14 points, marking that club's third premiership victory.

Teams

 Umpire - Jack Elder

Statistics

Goalkickers

See also
 1910 VFL season

VFL/AFL Grand Finals
Grand
Collingwood Football Club
Carlton Football Club
October 1910 sports events